Pierre el-Khoury (1930–2005), known as "Sheikh Pierre", was a prolific architect from Lebanon. He studied at École des Beaux-Arts, returned to Lebanon and designed more than 200 projects including Burj Al Ghazal Tower and Moritra residential building

He helped restore several houses in Baadarâne, Aley, and Aramoun and helped renovate a palace in Beit ed-Dine into a hotel with Amin Bizri in 1965. He worked with many younger architects including Kamal Homsi, Jacques Abou Khaled, Semaan Khoury, Pierre Bassil, Joseph Faysal, Antoine Gemayel, Joe Geitani, and Tarek Zeidan.

He died of bone cancer in Beirut.

Works
el-Khoury residence in Yarze (1959) 
 Clarisses Sisters Convent in Yarze (1960) 
 Monastery near Jezzine
 Penitentiary complex for the Roumieh Prison
 Basilica" at Our Lady of Harissa overlooking Jounieh Bay (with Noel Abouhamad)
 Lebanese Pavilion at the New York Fair (1963) with Assem Salam and Michel Harmouch 
 Byblos Center (1960) with Henri Edde
 Beirut Airport extension with Assaad Raad 
 Sabbagh Center with Alvar Aalto and Alfred Roth

See also
Architecture of Lebanon

Further reading
  Pierre El Khoury Architecture 1959–1999, by Pierre el Khoury Editions Dar An-Nahar, Beirut, 2000.

References

1930 births
2005 deaths
Lebanese architects
Deaths from cancer in Lebanon
Deaths from bone cancer